The Angami–Pochuri languages are a small family of Sino-Tibetan languages spoken in southern Nagaland and Northern Manipur of northeast India. Conventionally classified as "Naga", they are not clearly related to other Naga languages, and are conservatively classified as an independent branch of Sino-Tibetan, pending further research.

Coupe (2012) considers the Ao languages to be most closely related to Angami–Pochuri as part of a wider Angami–Ao group.

Languages
The Angami languages are:
Angami
Chokri (Chakri, Chakhesang)
Kheza
Sopvoma (Mao)
Poula (Poumai)

The Pochuri languages are:
Pochuri–Meluri
Ntenyi (Northern Rengma)
Rengma
Sumi (Sema)

Rengma–Simi might form a third branch according to Burling (2003).

References

 George van Driem (2001) Languages of the Himalayas: An Ethnolinguistic Handbook of the Greater Himalayan Region. Brill.

 
Languages of India